Charles Hathaway Larrabee (November 9, 1820January 20, 1883) was a Member of the U.S. House of Representatives from Wisconsin for the 36th Congress (1859-1860). He was a lawyer and Union army officer in the American Civil War.

Early life
Larrabee was born in Rome, New York on November 9, 1820, the son of Charles Larrabee of Connecticut. His family moved to Cincinnati, Ohio, where young Charles attended Springfield Academy and then Granville College from 1834 to 1836. At Granville he specialized in English studies, mathematics and ancient languages. Later, he read law with Samson Mason and W.A. Rogers in Springfield, Ohio.

He studied law with Congressman Samson Mason in Ohio, but before becoming a lawyer, Larrabee worked as an engineer and helped survey the Little Miami Railroad. He was admitted to the bar in September 1841, in Pontotoc, Mississippi, and in the same year ran unsuccessfully for the Mississippi Legislature.  He moved to Chicago in 1844, where he edited the Democratic Advocate and was elected city attorney.  On May 13, 1846, in Chicago, he married his first wife, Minerva Norton.

Wisconsin

In March 1847, Larrabee and his wife moved to a settlement in Dodge County in the Wisconsin Territory. Larrabee opened the first business in the settlement, where he sold goods from Chicago, shipped via Lake Michigan to Milwaukee and carried over land to Dodge County.  Larrabee became one of the leading residents of the small town, and gave it the name Horicon.  Larrabee is recognized as one of the founders of the city.

In October 1847, Larrabee was chosen as one of three representatives for Dodge County to the 2nd Wisconsin Constitutional Convention.  His chief preoccupation there was establishing a homestead exemption that would protect people from becoming homeless or destitute in the event of debt or liability.

After the new constitution was adopted in 1848, Larrabee was elected Circuit Judge for the 3rd district, and was, by virtue of that role, a member of the state's first Supreme Court. He was the youngest person to serve on that court.

A new Wisconsin Supreme Court was created in 1852.  Larrabee was chosen as the Democratic nominee for Chief Justice, but he was defeated by "the older and more experienced" Edward V. Whiton in the general election.

Larrabee served for ten years as Circuit Judge until his nomination for the U.S. House of Representatives in 1858.  He went on to win that election to represent Wisconsin's 3rd congressional district in the 36th Congress.  At the time, his district was the largest—by population—in the country, with 350,000 people.

In Congress, Larrabee spoke fervently in favor of maintaining the Union, and defended the patriotism and loyalty of German American immigrants living in Wisconsin.

Larrabee ran for re-election, and supported the platform of Senator Stephen A. Douglas, the Democratic candidate for U.S. President in the 1860 election. Douglas was defeated by Abraham Lincoln, and Larrabee lost his seat along with dozens of other Democrats in the realignment elections of 1860.

Civil War
After the news of the attack on Fort Sumpter reached Wisconsin, Larrabee wrote to the Milwaukee News, a Democratic paper, to rally his party in defense of the Union.  He also wrote to Wisconsin Governor Alexander Randall and General Rufus King to offer his services.

On April 18, 1861, Larrabee enlisted as a private in the Horicon Guard militia, where he was elected 2nd Lieutenant. The militia quickly marched to Milwaukee for enrollment in a Volunteer Regiment.  A month later, on May 28, 1861, Governor Randall commissioned Larrabee as a Major for the 5th Wisconsin Volunteer Infantry Regiment.

Larrabee marched with the 5th Regiment to Washington, D.C., where they eventually attached to the Army of the Potomac.

In 1862, the Regiment joined the Peninsula Campaign.  Larrabee participated in the Siege of Yorktown, assisting in the attack on a fortress along the Warwick River.  Days later, the regiment was involved in heavy fighting at Fort Magruder during the Battle of Williamsburg.  Larrabee was commended for his work inspiring and directing the regiment during the battle.

After the battle, they marched through the Chickahominy marsh land, and Larrabee fell ill along with others in the regiment.  He recuperated at White House, Virginia, but would continue to exhibit symptoms.

When new Wisconsin regiments were raised that summer, Governor Edward Salomon appointed Larrabee to organize and command the new 24th Wisconsin Volunteer Infantry Regiment.  When the 24th regiment mustered into service in August, Larrabee was promoted to Colonel.  The regiment was quickly ordered to Kentucky, before much drilling or preparation.

The Regiment was attached to the Army of the Cumberland, and arrived in time to join the Battle of Perryville, which ended the Confederate incursion in Kentucky.  During the battle, the 24th was assigned to defend a cannon battery, which came under assault from a Confederate brigade, led by Daniel Weisiger Adams.  The attack was repulsed, and Larrabee was commended by his brigade commander, Colonel Nicholas Greusel, for his leadership in the defense of the battery.

After the battle, Larrabee again fell ill and recuperated in Nashville, Tennessee, while the regiment fought at the Battle of Stones River.  In March, 1863, Larrabee returned to the regiment for a short time, but ultimately resigned in August due to his ongoing illness.

Postbellum years

In the spring of 1864, still plagued by his illnesses—diarrhea and erysipelas in the head—he sought relief in the climates of California, then Nevada, then Oregon, where he practiced law with his old congressional colleague, Lansing Stout.  He later returned to California, where his wife died in August, 1873.

After his wife's death, he moved to Seattle in the Washington Territory and resided with Beriah Brown.  While there he became a member of a state constitutional convention and helped to organize a state university in Seattle.

In 1868 he was in Los Angeles, California, where he and William A. Winder, the former commander of the U.S. prison on Alcatraz Island, opened an agency "for the purchase and sale of lands in the southern part of the state." In April 1868 he was elected city attorney. None of the officials elected at that time served, however, and the election "seems to have been wholly ignored."

Larrabee eventually settled in San Bernardino, California, where he resumed his law practice.

Death

Larrabee was killed in a train accident at the Tehachapi Loop near Tehachapi, California, on January 20, 1883. He was survived by a son and daughter. Interment was in the Masonic Cemetery, San Francisco.

An attempt was made in the settlement of his estate to show that the claim by his second wife was not legitimate, but she produced a marriage certificate and letters to show that it was, and the marriage was therefore allowed in San Bernardino Superior Court. In June 1884, John Anderson, executor of Larrabee's estate, filed a court action in San Bernardino against the Central Pacific Railroad, asking $100,000 in damages.

The town of Larrabee, Wisconsin, is named in his honor.

References and notes

Further reading
 Testament to Larrabee after his death, San Bernardino Times, quoted in "Col. C.H. Larrabee," Los Angeles Herald, January 26, 1883

External links
 

|-

|-

1820 births
1883 deaths
Accidental deaths in California
Politicians from Rome, New York
People from Horicon, Wisconsin
People of Wisconsin in the American Civil War
Justices of the Wisconsin Supreme Court
Wisconsin state court judges
Union Army officers
Democratic Party members of the United States House of Representatives from Wisconsin
Railway accident deaths in the United States
19th-century American politicians
U.S. state supreme court judges admitted to the practice of law by reading law
19th-century American judges
Burials at Woodlawn Memorial Park Cemetery (Colma, California)
Burials at Masonic Cemetery (San Francisco)